1959–60 was the 14th season of the Western International Hockey League.

Standings

 Trail Smoke Eaters		25-13-2-52	240-201
 Nelson Maple Leafs		19-18-3-41	216-193
 Rossland Warriors		13-26-1-27	183-245

Playoffs

Semi final (Round-robin tournament)
Note: Trail started the series with 3 points, Nelson 2, & Rossland 1.

 Trail Smoke Eaters		5-3-0-13
 Nelson Maple Leafs		4-4-0-10
 Rossland Warriors		3-5-0-7

Final (Best of 5)

 Trail 7 Nelson 3
 Trail 7 Nelson 6
 Trail 7 Nelson 1

The Trail Smoke Eaters beat Nelson Maple Leafs 3 wins to none.

The Trail Smoke Eaters advanced to the 1959-60 British Columbia Senior Playoffs.

References 

Spokane Daily Chronicle - 14 Mar 1960

Western International Hockey League seasons
Wihl
Wihl